Ziming is the pinyin transcription of various Chinese names. People with these names include:

Courtesy name 
Lü Meng (178–220), Chinese military general
Sun Liang (243–260), emperor of Eastern Wu
Yuan Hao (died 529), imperial prince and pretender to the throne of China
Ren Renfa (1254–1327), Chinese landscape architect, artist and government official
Lu Tang (ca 1520 – ca 1570), Chinese army officer

Given name 
Ding Ziming (active 1925–1929), Chinese film actor, see list of Chinese films before 1930
Li Ziming (1903–1993), Chinese martial artist
Chen Ziming (1952–2014), Chinese dissident
Doris Yang Ziming, producer of the 1997 film Made in Hong Kong
Ziming Zhuang, creator of BotSeer in 2007
Alex Yam Ziming (born 1981), Singaporean politician

See also
Zhiming, also a Chinese given name
Zimin (surname), a Russian surname

Chinese given names